J. J. Wolf was the defending champion but lost in the semifinals to Stefan Kozlov.

Kozlov won the title after defeating Max Purcell 4–6, 6–2, 6–4 in the final.

Seeds

Draw

Finals

Top half

Bottom half

References

External links
Main draw
Qualifying draw

Columbus Challenger - 1
Columbus Challenger